Dolna Grupa is a village in the administrative district of Gmina Dragacz, within Świecie County, Kuyavian-Pomeranian Voivodeship, in north-central Poland.

The village has a population of 1,030.

Dolna Grupa is appr. 7 km west from Grudziadz

References

Dolna Grupa